Road running is the sport of running on a measured course over an established road.  This differs from track and field on a regular track and cross country running over natural terrain.

These events are usually classified as long-distance according to athletics terminology, with races typically ranging from 5 kilometers to 42.2 kilometers in the marathon. They may involve large numbers of runners or wheelchair entrants. The four most common IAAF recognized distances for road running events are 5K runs, 10K runs, half marathons and marathons.

Running on the road is an alternative surface to running on a trail, track, or treadmill. For many people looking to participate in running as an activity or sport, there are multiple opportunities that can be found on the road.

Road running is one of several forms of road racing, which also includes road bicycle racing and motor vehicle road racing.

IAAF 
The international governing body for road racing is the IAAF. The IAAF aims to set the standards for competitions by ensuring that all participants are drug-free and that all equipment used is legal. The IAAF measures each race course to give it an IAAF certification rating. Once a race course is certified, the course can be counted for different records or rankings.

Courses
Racecourses are usually held on the streets of major cities and towns but can be on any road. The 24-hour run is also recognized. Of these, the 5K, 10K, 25K, 30K, half marathon, marathon, and 100K are distances that are recognized for world records.

Some major events have unique distances.

Participation
Most road running events are open to the general public. Participants of varying running ability are participants.  It is not unusual for large events to number in thousands of participants.  Men and women compete side by side, and professional runners run in the same events as the average runner. In more prestigious races this is less likely to happen as there will be separate heats for men and women/ professional and non-professional athletes. In certain athletic events, first time amateurs are welcome to participate in the same event as members of running clubs and even current world-class champions.

This wide availability makes road racing extremely popular, and millions of people worldwide run thousands of races each year. In the U.S., 18.1 million people registered for recreational road races in 2018. While world record-holders can maintain paces of 4–5 minutes per mile (2,5 – 3 minutes per km), non-professional runners average around 10 min/mile (6 min/km). The majority of registrants run for personal reasons such as achievement and fitness rather than to compete, and many race courses accommodate this by staying open long enough for participants to jog or walk the distance.

Timing 
In order to record times for participants of road races, the founder of the race typically pays a timing company to electronically take times. Electronic timing companies utilize a technology called radio-frequency identification (RFID for short). RFID technology is then placed either in a disposable race bib, a shoe chip that is tied to shoelaces, or an ankle bracelet. RFID timing mats are then placed at the finish line of the race and as soon as the runner crosses over the line their time will be automatically recorded. This technology has developed over time to be the most efficient form of recording multiple athlete times.

Benefits of Road Running

Diversity 
Road running is recognizable for its diverse features. Anyone is welcome to participate in road running whether it be for recreational activity or for the purpose of competition. Running is an activity that attracts people from all over the world and for any age. For example, many road racing events recognize finishers in an age group system which acts as a way to reward younger or older athletes who may not be able to compete with runners in a prime age.

Charity 
Road races are often community-wide events that highlight or raise money for an issue or project.  In the US, Susan G. Komen's Race for the Cure is held nationwide to raise breast cancer awareness.  This race is also run in Germany, Italy and Puerto Rico. Similarly, Race for Life holds races throughout the UK to raise money for Cancer Research UK. First person "race reports" frequently appear on the Dead Runners Society electronic mailing list. Dublin, Ireland's Women's Mini-Marathon is said to be the largest all-female event of its kind in the world.

Motivation to be Active 
For many, competing in a local road race can be the motivation needed for individuals to pursue physical activity. In a study done by the bureau for labor statistics, road running ranked third in the most common form of sport and exercise activity for Americans.

Physical Benefit 
Running on the roads has a different effect on the muscles in the human body opposed to running on the treadmill. Treadmills are made to assist running form due to the way the belt pushes your legs back enhancing movement. Running on the road through various conditions such as hills will do more to strengthen glutes, hamstrings, quads, and smaller muscles in the legs. Additionally, running on the road can help improve bone density as your body breaks down from impact and then regenerates itself.

Disadvantages to road running

Impact 
As with any type of running, there is a risk to natural wear and tear on the human body that comes with the different movements required to participate. The difference with road running opposed to other forms is that for long periods of time, a runner will be landing on a harder surface continuously which can lead to various overuse injuries. In any given year, on average 65–80 percent of runners experience some type of injury. In order to decrease the risk of becoming injured from impact on the road, runners can change their shoes every 300–400 miles (500–650 km). The reason that replacing shoes is important for runners is because high mileage shoes have poor shock absorption and worn down tread which can cause pain.

Danger 
One element that is apart exclusively with road running opposed to running in any other location is vehicles that drive by regularly at high speeds. In a study by the company Road ID, it was found that on average 122,000 runners are hit by vehicles and end up in hospitals each year. This figure does not include runners who are hit but do not end up in the hospital. There are different precautions that runners can take in order to decrease their risk of being hit that include: wearing reflective gear, wearing bright colors, running only during daylight, wearing a headlight, and running on the side of the road opposite traffic.

Costs 
At first running can seem like a very cheap activity that anyone can partake in. However, it is important to acknowledge that there are certain expenses that any road runner will come across. For one, replacing running shoes every 400–500 miles (650–800 km) is a very important habit for every runner to do that will not be cheap. Additionally, road race entry fees can be expensive because they are meant to cover the fees incurred by the race organizer. In some cases, the price for big city marathons can be anywhere from 150 to 300 dollars per entry fee.

Governing body and international organizations 
National governing bodies which are affiliated to the IAAF are responsible for road races held in their country. Of the thousands of road races held each year, 238 races, including some premier ones, are members of the Association of International Marathons and Distance Races (AIMS).  Many race organizers (or the running clubs which conduct the races) are members of the Road Runners Club of America.  In addition, the USA Track & Field plays a role in selecting representatives for certain international competitions under the Amateur Sports Act of 1978.

Competitors from around the world participate in what are dubbed the "elite" races for cash prizes. Elite level road running series include the World Marathon Majors, the Great Run series, and IAAF Road Race Label Events.

Main competitions
Marathon and half marathon events
World Marathon Cup
World Half Marathon Championships
European Marathon Cup
European Half Marathon Cup

Race-walking events
World Race Walking Team Championships						
European Race Walking Cup

See also

Fell running
Cross country running
List of largest running events
Orienteering
Track running
Trail running

References

External links
Road Runners Club of America
Association of Road Racing Statisticians
Running USA
Road Runners Club UK
British Association of Road Races
New York Road Runners
5k race directory
Eastleigh Running Club

 
Athletics by type
Running by type
Long-distance running